Chang Tzi-chin is a Taiwanese politician. He currently serves as the Minister of the Environmental Protection Administration of the Executive Yuan.

Education
Chang earned his bachelor's degree in environmental engineering from National Cheng Kung University in 1980 and his master's degree in the same field from National Chiao Tung University in 1995.

Political career
Chang served as an associate technical specialist of the Department of Environmental Protection of Taipei City Government in 1982–1987. In 1987–1996, he became the Section Chief of the Environmental Protection Administration. He served as the section chief of the Environmental Protection Department of Taiwan Provincial Government in 1996–1997, as the director of the Northern Region Environmental Protection Center in 1997-1999 and as the executive officer of the Secretariat in 1999–2000. In 2000–2005, he became the director-general of the Environmental Protection Bureau of the Taipei County Government and in 2005-2006 as Deputy Commissioner.

References

Living people
National Cheng Kung University alumni
National Chiao Tung University alumni
Taiwanese Ministers of Environment
Year of birth missing (living people)